The Verzée is a  river in the Loire-Atlantique and Maine-et-Loire départements, western France. Its source is at Soudan. It flows generally east-southeast. It is a right tributary of the Oudon into which it flows at Segré.

Communes along its course
This list is ordered from source to mouth: 
Loire-Atlantique: Soudan, Noyal-sur-Brutz, Villepot
Maine-et-Loire: Pouancé, La Prévière, Armaillé, Noëllet, Le Tremblay, Combrée, Le Bourg-d'Iré, Noyant-la-Gravoyère, Sainte-Gemmes-d'Andigné, Segré

References

Rivers of France
Rivers of Loire-Atlantique
Rivers of Maine-et-Loire
Rivers of Pays de la Loire